Toxopeus is a Dutch surname. It is a Grecism for bowman, from Greek τοξοποιός, and was probably adopted by people named boogman. People with this name include:

Edzo Toxopeus (1918–2009), Dutch politician, Minister of the Interior 1959–65
Jacqueline Toxopeus (born 1964), Dutch field hockey goalkeeper
Lambertus Johannes Toxopeus (1894–1951), Java-born Dutch lepidopterist

See also
Toxopeus' yellow tiger, butterfly named after Lambertus Toxopeus

References

Occupational surnames
Surnames of Dutch origin